Four Kids and It is a 2020 British fantasy film directed by Andy De Emmony and written by Simon Lewis and Mark Oswin. It is based on the 2012 novel Four Children and It by Jacqueline Wilson, which is based on E. Nesbit's 1902 novel Five Children and It.

The film stars Paula Patton, Russell Brand, Michael Caine, and Matthew Goode.

Plot
The film is set at a beach in Cornwall where siblings (Ros and Robbie) spend a holiday with their father (David), his girlfriend (Alice), and her daughters (Samantha and Maudie). The children dislike each other at first but begin to get along once they discover a mysterious magical creature, Psammead or Sand Fairy, on the beach. Psammead can grant one wish a day, but the wish ends at sunset.

Using a wish with Psammead, the children travel back 100 years. There they meet the aristocratic Tristan Trent who holds Ros at gunpoint and demands to know about the Sand Fairy. However, Samantha, Robbie, and Maudie ask Psammead for superpowers and rescue Ros. 

Next, the children travel to the past to learn how to make a wish permanent, but are unsuccessful. The children return to the present, where Tristan Trent III wants to use the Sand Fairy for dastardly deeds. Tristan finds the Sand Fairy's location by putting a tracking device under Ros's shoe. The children take Psammead with them and trap Tristan on the beach. 

Afterward, the children realize they like each other. They take Psammead to their house, hiding him from their parents in the bathroom.

Cast
 Billy Jenkins as Robbie
 Ashley Aufderheide as Samantha (Smash)
 Teddie-Rose Malleson-Allen as Ros
 Ellie-Mae Siame as Maudie
 Paula Patton as Alice
 Russell Brand as Tristan Trent III
 Michael Caine as the voice of Psammead, Sand Fairy
 Matthew Goode as David
 Cheryl as Coco * 
 William Franklyn-Miller as Carl
 Paul Bazely as Sgt. Gas
 Finbarr Doyle as Security Guard

Production
Principal photography began in July 2018 in Ireland.

Reception
The site's critics' consensus reads: "Four Kids and It  has a few moments of whimsy and charm, but it's not enough to leave a lasting impression." On Metacritic, the film has a weighted average score of 42 out of 100 based on reviews from seven critics, indicating "mixed or average reviews".

Guy Lodge of Variety wrote, "'Careful what you wish for' may have been the essential moral takeaway from the sourcebooks, but that wasn't to discourage wishing for anything at all: In all respects, this serviceable but anodyne programmer could dream a bit bigger." Justin Lowe of The Hollywood Reporter called it "More curio than classic, Four Kids and It may hold children's attention (and sometimes test adults' patience) over the movie's brief running time, but seems unlikely to inspire many a second viewing." Anna Smith of Empire wrote: "The kids and Caine are good, but this lacks the magic of its source novels. Younger children may enjoy it, but its attempts to entertain older viewers mostly fall flat."

The film earned $588,001 at the global box office.

References

2020 films
2020 fantasy films
British fantasy films
Films based on children's books
Films based on British novels
Films shot in Ireland
Magic realism films
2020s English-language films
2020s British films

External links